Thomas Henry Goodwin Newton (1835–1907) was the chairman of Imperial Continental Gas Association (now known as Calor Gas), one of the United Kingdom's largest energy businesses. He used "Goodwin" as his main christian name, which became a family middle name for generations afterwards.

Early years
The eldest son of William Newton II of Whateley Hall near Castle Bromwich and Barrells Hall at Ullenhall near Henley-in-Arden in Warwickshire, Goodwin Newton was born in 1835 in Birmingham.

He was educated at St. John's College part of Cambridge University along with his brother Canon Horace Newton, and graduated in 1858. Following this he was called to the Bar by the members of Middle Temple, but never practiced due to his father dying.

Inheritance
Upon the death of his father William II in 1862, Goodwin Newton inherited Barrells Hall and became Lord of the Manor of Ullenhall. Before William II purchased Barrells Hall in 1856 the family house had been (and continued to be in addition to Barrells Hall for 20 years after the Barrells Hall purchase) Whateley Hall, Castle Bromwich, which was destroyed for development in 1935.

He and his brother inherited a "quite absurdly large fortune" estimated at around £100 million in today's money. The family fortune came from Welsh Slate Quarries on the estate he owned by Llanberis, North Wales which including Bryn Bras Castle, as well as vast amounts of freehold land in Birmingham, including large portions of New Street in the centre, and many ground rents. In his obituary from 1907 The Times stated that he was one of the largest owners of freehold property in Birmingham.

Upon the death of his father he also gave up a career as a barrister and potential Member of Parliament in the House of Commons to become a Country Gentleman and landowner at the family seat.

Scottish estates
With his younger brother Canon Horace Newton, a very well respected vicar and Gentleman, who was Vicar of Driffield and later Redditch, he bought the Glencripesdale Estate on Loch Sunart, Argyll, Scotland as a holiday home for the family.

Positions held and Lord of the Manor
He was chairman of Imperial Continental Gas Association, now known as Calor Gas, for a long period during the late nineteenth century, at a time of much growth within the company.

He was chairman of the Llanberis Slate Company which comprised three quarries: Cefn Du Quarry, the Goodman Quarry and the Cambrian Quarry  

He was a County Magistrate for Warwickshire.

In 1887 he was the High Sheriff of Warwickshire, which was also the Jubilee year for Queen Victoria. The London Gazette records him as being invited to Windsor Castle for a celebration of Queen Victoria's birthday with the other High Sheriffs from around the country.

He was a founder member of the Warwickshire County Council, such was his position and respect within the County.

He was Lord of the Manors of Ullenhall and also Aspleigh, both in Warwickshire, and also Oldberrow in Worcestershire, which he inherited from his father, and upon his death passed on to his oldest son and heir Hugh Goodwin Newton.

He had Advowson rights for the vicarage of Ullenhall, and with his brother was a great supporter of the Church of England.

Philanthropy
During his lifetime he became famous for his philanthropy, giving away millions of pounds in today's money, and building hospitals, schools, theatres, churches and donating to various charities with the support of his brother Canon Horace Newton.

References

English philanthropists
High Sheriffs of Warwickshire
1835 births
1907 deaths
Sheriffs of Warwickshire
19th-century British philanthropists
19th-century English businesspeople